Live in Helsinki may refer to:

 6.12., a 2001 album by Värttinä, known as Live in Helsinki in the United States
 Live in Helsinki (Zu album), 2003